Missen Ridge is a long, ice-covered ridge situated south of Davis Ice Piedmont and extending along the peninsula of which Cape Hooker is the northeast point, on the north coast of Victoria Land, Antarctica. It was named by the Australian National Antarctic Research Expeditions (ANARE) for R. Missen, a weather technician on the ANARE (Thala Dan) cruise along this coast in 1962.

References

Ridges of Victoria Land
Pennell Coast